Andrej Košarišťan (born 10 December 1993) is a Slovak professional ice hockey goaltender currently playing for HK Dukla Michalovce of the Slovak Extraliga.

Career statistics

Regular season and playoffs

References

External links

 

1993 births
Living people
Slovak ice hockey goaltenders
People from Dolný Kubín
Sportspeople from the Žilina Region
HK Trnava players
HC '05 Banská Bystrica players
HC 07 Detva players
ŠHK 37 Piešťany players
MHk 32 Liptovský Mikuláš players
HC Nové Zámky players
HC Košice players
Rytíři Kladno players
HK Dukla Michalovce players
Slovak expatriate ice hockey players in the Czech Republic